Songavatnet (also spelled as Songevatnet or Songavatn) is a lake in Vinje Municipality in Vestfold og Telemark county, Norway. The lake lies just south of the border of Hardangervidda National Park and just southeast of the mountain Vassdalseggi. The lake flows out into the river Songa which flows to the southeast into the nearby lake Totak.

Songavatnet has two dams: Trolldalsdammen and Songadammen. Both are rock-fill dams with a sealing core of moraine mass. The two dams on the south end of the lake are used to regulate the surface elevation of the mountain lake so that it can be used for hydroelectric power production. This was the largest dam in Northern Europe at the time it was completed in the 1960s.

Media gallery

See also
List of lakes in Norway

References

Vinje
Lakes of Vestfold og Telemark